Willenberg may refer to:

 Samuel Willenberg (1923–2016), Polish-Israeli sculptor and Holocaust survivor
Jan Willenberg (1571–1613), author of woodcuts, prints and drawings active in Moravia and Bohemia.

Places 
 Willenberg culture, an Iron Age archaeological complex in northern Europe
 Wielbark, Pomeranian Voivodeship (German: Willenberg), a village in northern Poland
 Wielbark, Warmian-Masurian Voivodeship (German: Willenberg), a village in north-east Poland
 Willenburg, a ruined castle in Germany

See also 
 Wielbark (disambiguation)